Lucas Lautaro Guzmán (born 17 July 1994) is an Argentine taekwondo athlete. He won a bronze medal at the 2019 World Taekwondo Championships on the men's flyweight category.

He represented Argentina at the 2020 Summer Olympics.

References

External links

Living people
1994 births
Taekwondo practitioners at the 2010 Summer Youth Olympics
Taekwondo practitioners at the 2015 Pan American Games
Taekwondo practitioners at the 2019 Pan American Games
Sportspeople from Buenos Aires
Pan American Games medalists in taekwondo
Pan American Games bronze medalists for Argentina
Pan American Games gold medalists for Argentina
Universiade medalists in taekwondo
Universiade medalists for Argentina
World Taekwondo Championships medalists
Pan American Taekwondo Championships medalists
Medalists at the 2017 Summer Universiade
Medalists at the 2015 Pan American Games
Medalists at the 2019 Pan American Games
Taekwondo practitioners at the 2020 Summer Olympics
Olympic taekwondo practitioners of Argentina
21st-century Argentine people